John Frost (13 February 1920 – q1 1988) was an English professional footballer who played as a goalkeeper in the Football League for York City, in non-League football for North Shields and was on the books of Grimsby Town without making a league appearance.

References

1920 births
Sportspeople from Wallsend
Footballers from Tyne and Wear
1988 deaths
English footballers
Association football goalkeepers
North Shields F.C. players
Grimsby Town F.C. players
York City F.C. players
English Football League players